Bosko's Soda Fountain is a 1931 one-reel short subject featuring Bosko as part of the Looney Tunes series. It was released on November 14, 1931 and was directed by Hugh Harman. The film score was composed by Frank Marsales.

This cartoon marks the first appearance of Honey's cat-like son, Wilbur.

Plot

Bosko, depicted as the owner/runner of a soda shop or ice cream parlor, serves sodas to a mouse and his old teacher (a hippo). His teacher's soda is sprayed in her face by a fan, causing her to leave the shop in anger. Then a dog enters the building and eats a pile of ice cream, causing the dog's body to become square-shaped. Bosko discovers what has happened to the dog and used its body as an accordion.

Meanwhile, Honey's bratty and spoiled cat-like son, Wilbur demands an ice-cream cone after rehearsing singing and the piano against his will. Bosko sends the dog away, and then delivers an ice cream to Wilbur. Wilbur dislikes the flavor Bosko delivered to him (vanilla) and rudely retaliates, which ends in Bosko sitting, surprised, in the washing basket with a pair of underwear on his head.

References

External links
 

1931 films
1931 animated films
Films scored by Frank Marsales
Films directed by Hugh Harman
Bosko films
Films set in restaurants
Looney Tunes shorts
Warner Bros. Cartoons animated short films
1930s Warner Bros. animated short films